Malus rockii is a crabapple species in the family Rosaceae. It is native to China and Bhutan.

Some subspecies of the Siberian crab apple (Malus baccata) are considered synonymous with this species.

References

rockii
Crabapples
Trees of Bhutan
Trees of China